Saint-Rambert is part of the name of several communes in France:

 Saint-Just-Saint-Rambert, in the Loire département
 Saint-Rambert-d'Albon, in the Drôme département
 Saint-Rambert-en-Bugey, in the Ain département